Hardington Mandeville is a village and civil parish in Somerset, England, situated  south west of Yeovil in the South Somerset district.  The village has a population of 585.

History

The Hardington part of the name of the village means settlement of Heardred's people.

The manor was held before the Norman Conquest by Gunhilda, the daughter of Godwin, Earl of Wessex and then by William the Conqueror. during the 12th century it was granted to the Mandeville family, from which the second part of the name is taken. It was later held by the Portmans of Orchard Portman.

The parish was part of the hundred of Houndsborough.

Notable people

 Local councillor and village resident Cathy Bakewell was made Baroness of Hardington Mandeville in 2013.
 Sir Herbert Bartlett (1842 – 1921), English civil engineer and contractor, was born in Hardington Mandeville.

Governance

The parish council has responsibility for local issues, including setting an annual precept (local rate) to cover the council's operating costs and producing annual accounts for public scrutiny. The parish council evaluates local planning applications and works with the local police, district council officers, and neighbourhood watch groups on matters of crime, security, and traffic. The parish council's role also includes initiating projects for the maintenance and repair of parish facilities, as well as consulting with the district council on the maintenance, repair, and improvement of highways, drainage, footpaths, public transport, and street cleaning. Conservation matters (including trees and listed buildings) and environmental issues are also the responsibility of the council.

The town falls within the Non-metropolitan district of South Somerset, which was formed on 1 April 1974 under the Local Government Act 1972, having previously been part of Yeovil Rural District. The district council is responsible for local planning and building control, local roads, council housing, environmental health, markets and fairs, refuse collection and recycling, cemeteries and crematoria, leisure services, parks, and tourism.

Somerset County Council is responsible for running the largest and most expensive local services such as education, social services, libraries, main roads, public transport, policing and fire services, trading standards, waste disposal and strategic planning.

It is also part of the Yeovil county constituency represented in the House of Commons of the Parliament of the United Kingdom. It elects one Member of Parliament (MP) by the first past the post system of election.

Geography

Nearby is the Hardington Moor biological Site of Special Scientific Interest and National Nature Reserve where the meadows are examples of species-rich unimproved neutral grassland, which is now nationally rare. The rare French oat-grass is very abundant on the site and the fields are home to a wide variety of plant species, most notably adder's tongue, corky-fruited water-dropwort and large numbers of green-winged orchid. Invertebrates found at the site include butterflies such as gatekeeper, small tortoiseshell and common blue. Less commonly seen are large skipper, green-veined white and green hairstreak.

Religious sites

The Church of Saint Mary was rebuilt in 1123 on the site of an earlier church. It has had renovation work in the 15th century and again in 1864. The circular font is thought to be original dating from 1123, and the clock mechanism was built and installed before 1707. There are 6 bells in the tower, 3 of which are from the Purdue (Closworth) foundry, with the earliest being dated 1591. It has been designated as a Grade II* listed building.

References

External links

Villages in South Somerset
Civil parishes in Somerset